Scopula rubellata is a moth of the family Geometridae. It was described by Staudinger in 1871. It is found in France, Spain and Portugal.

References

Moths described in 1871
rubellata
Moths of Europe
Taxa named by Otto Staudinger